The Queen Alexandra Bridge is a road traffic, pedestrian and former railway bridge spanning the River Wear in North East England, linking the Deptford and Southwick areas of Sunderland. The steel truss bridge was designed by Charles A. Harrison (a nephew of Robert Stephenson's assistant). It was built by Sir William Arrol between 1907 and 1909 and officially opened by The Earl of Durham, on behalf of Queen Alexandra on 10 June 1909.

In 1899 the North Eastern Railway and the Sunderland Corporation agreed to build the bridge to improve communications across the river and to connect the coalfields of Annfield Plain and Washington with Sunderland's south docks. Before the completion of the bridge, road traffic crossing the river had to use one of two ferries which crossed below near to where the bridge is today.

The approaches to the bridge were completed in 1907 by the Mitchell Brothers of Glasgow and the bridge proper comprises three  land spans (weighing 1,000 tons of steel each) and a  river span (weighing 2,600 tons of steel) and was the heaviest bridge in the United Kingdom at the time. The bridge was built from each side of the river and the two halves came together at noon on 15 October 1908. In all, a total of 8,500 tons of steel, 4,500 tons of granite, 60,000 tons of red sandstone from Dumfries, and 350,000 bricks were used and the cost of completion was £450,000 (equivalent to £ in 2016). The bridge also housed gas and water mains and in later years, high voltage electricity cables and a pumped rising-main for sewage. 

About six million tons of coal passed over the upper-deck annually for export but the trade rapidly declined at the end of the 1910s. For the last few years only one train per day passed over the bridge. The last goods train ran over in 1921, but the lower-deck continues as a valuable road link. In the Second World War, the upper-deck was used as a searchlight and anti-aircraft platform. The railway and decking at each end of the bridge were finally removed near to the end of the 20th century. A large free standing brick and stone viaduct fragment remains on the north side of the Bridge.

From 21 March 2005, the bridge had been restricted to southbound traffic whilst repainting and repair work was carried out on the 96-year-old structure, which was due to take almost a year to complete. It reopened for both lanes of traffic on 12 October 2006, having been partly closed for 18 months and costing £6.3m in repairs.

Previously classified as part of the A1231, the road across the bridge was reclassified as the B1539 when the Northern Spire Bridge was opened to traffic on 29 August 2018.

References

Sources
National Grid for Learning
University of Newcastle Upon Tyne

Bridges across the River Wear
Bridges in Tyne and Wear
Bridges completed in 1909
Truss bridges
Transport in the City of Sunderland
Roads in England
Road-rail bridges
Sunderland